Igliano is a comune (municipality) in the Province of Cuneo in the Italian region Piedmont, about  southeast of Turin and about  east of Cuneo, with an area of .  it had a population of 80.

Igliano borders the municipalities of Castellino Tanaro, Marsaglia, Murazzano, Roascio, and Torresina.

Demographic evolution

References 

Cities and towns in Piedmont
Comunità Montana Valli Mongia, Cevetta e Langa Cebana